Strumella  may refer to:
 Strumella (moth), a genus of moth in the family Lasiocampidae
 Strumella (fungus), a genus of fungi in the family Sarcosomataceae